Andrew McCullough (born 30 January 1990) is a former Australian professional rugby league footballer who played as a  for the Brisbane Broncos, Newcastle Knights, and St. George Illawarra Dragons in the National Rugby League (NRL), and has played for Queensland in the State of Origin series.

Background
McCullough was born in Dalby, Queensland, Australia to Wendy and Graham McCullough.

In 2018, McCullough married Carlie Harrison in a ceremony at Byron Bay.

Biography
McCullough attended Dalby State School and subsequently Dalby State High School, before accepting a scholarship to Brisbane State High School for grade 12. During his time in Dalby, he played for the Dalby Devils and on a number of school teams. He played for the Australian Schoolboys team in 2007 while attending Brisbane State High School. In 2003, while he was in grade 8, he had already signed with the Brisbane Broncos. He made his debut in the Telstra Premiership against the Cronulla-Sutherland Sharks on 17 May 2008, becoming the first player born in the 1990s to make his debut in the NRL's top grade. In 2009, he was named the Broncos' "Rookie of the Year".

McCullough was named the 2012 Brisbane Broncos season's player of the year. He played for the Broncos in their extra-time loss to the North Queensland Cowboys in the 2015 NRL Grand Final, and was selected to make his State of Origin debut for Queensland in 2018, starting all three games of that series at hooker following the retirement of former Queensland captain Cameron Smith.

After 260 games for the club, but by now being overlooked for a spot in the starting line-up ahead of the younger Jake Turpin, McCullough left the Broncos on 21 May 2020 to join the Newcastle Knights for the remainder of the 2020 season. He played in 8 matches for the Knights and scored two tries before having his season ended by a hamstring injury. He was then removed from the Knights' playing squad list to make way for the mid-season signing of Blake Green.

Newcastle chose not to renew McCullough's contract and he was able to return to Brisbane after taking up a player option in his contract for 2021.

On 15 February 2021, he signed a three-year deal to join St. George Illawarra. He made his debut for St. George Illawarra in round 1 of the 2021 NRL season against rivals Cronulla-Sutherland where the Dragons lost 32-18 at Kogarah Oval.

McCullough was selected for the Queensland Maroons in Game 2 of the 2021 State of Origin Series, following an injury to incumbent hooker Harry Grant.
In round 22 of the 2021 NRL season, McCullough was taken from the field with an ankle injury in the Saints loss against Penrith.  On 17 August 2021, it was announced that McCullough would be ruled out for the remainder of the season.

On 10 November 2022, McCullough announced his immediate retirement from rugby league with a year remaining on his contract with St. George Illawarra.

Statistics

References

External links

St. George Illawarra profile

1990 births
Living people
Brisbane Broncos players
Newcastle Knights players
St. George Illawarra Dragons players
Norths Devils players
Queensland rugby league team players
Queensland Rugby League State of Origin players
Prime Minister's XIII players
Rugby league hookers
Rugby league players from Queensland
People educated at Brisbane State High School
People from the Darling Downs